Dompé Farmaceutici is a privately held pharmaceutical company based in Milan. Founded as a compounding pharmacy in 1890 by Piedmontese Onorato Dompé, the company has grown to a global pharmaceutical company with around 800 employees. In 2012, Dompé acquired the eye health-focused Italian pharmaceutical company Anabasis Srl; they went on to develop the Anabasis product cenegermin, an eye drop containing recombinant human Nerve growth factor, as a treatment for neurotrophic keratitis. Cenegermin was approved by the FDA in August 2018 as the first available treatment for neurotrophic keratitis, and received orphan drug designation. Cenegermin is marketed under the name Oxervate.

References

Pharmaceutical companies of Italy